Abdelkrim Benarous (born June 2, 1997) is an Algerian footballer who plays for Stade Tunisien in the Tunisian Ligue Professionnelle 1.

References

External links

Living people
1997 births
Algerian footballers
MC Alger players
Association football forwards
21st-century Algerian people